Drosera platypoda, the fan-leaved sundew, is a tuberous perennial species in the genus Drosera that is endemic to south-west Western Australia. It grows 15 to 20 cm tall with a basal rosette of leaves with alternate cauline leaves along the stem. It is native to a region from Manjimup south-west to an area around the Scott River and east to Cape Riche. It grows in winter-wet sandy soils in heathland. It flowers in October.

It was first formally described by Nicolai Stepanovitch Turczaninow in 1854.

See also 
List of Drosera species

References

External links 

Carnivorous plants of Australia
Caryophyllales of Australia
Eudicots of Western Australia
Plants described in 1854
platypoda
Taxa named by Nikolai Turczaninow